Saleh Al Abdooli was the Chief Executive Officer of Etisalat Group, a telecom operator based in the United Arab Emirates with a presence in 16 countries in the Middle East. Al Abdooli stepped down as the CEO after 28 years. He joined Etisalat Group in 1992 and became CEO of Etisalat UAE in 2012, and CEO of Etisalat Group in 2016.  Abdooli is also the Deputy Chairman of the Board of Directors, Chairman of the Executive Committee for Etisalat Misr and Etisalat Services Holding Company. Saleh Al Abdooli was most recently appointed as Etisalat's representative on Mobily Board of Directors and Chairman of Thuraya, a mobile satellite communications company.

Education
Al Abdooli completed his master's degree in Electrical Engineering and Telecom from the University of Colorado Boulder.

Career
Al Abdooli began his career with Etisalat as an Engineer for Mobile Systems Planning in 1992. For eight years after his appointment, Al Abdooli served the company in various roles and was promoted as the Chief Engineer of Mobile Systems Planning. In 2001, he was appointed as the Managing Engineer for Mobile Systems.

Al Abdooli has been pivotal in corporate and global expansion investments at Etisalat. He has served as the Chairman of the Etisalat Group's technical committee which oversees its international expansion. During this phase, he led the technical committee that prepared and designed the Etisalat GSM Network in Zanzibar, the company's first network outside the UAE as well as in Sudan and Afghanistan. He also served as Chairman of the committee responsible for preparing Etisalat's proposal to establish the second GSM network in Saudi Arabia, a contract won over the bids of Vodafone, Telefónica, Telecom Italia Mobile & MTC and other major players in the industry. Al Abdooli has also been chosen as a member of the board for Etisalat Nigeria.

CEO of Etisalat Misr (2007-2012)
During his tenure as the CEO of Etisalat Misr, Al Abdooli also played an active role in the development of Etilasat's business in Egypt. The company won one million subscribers in 55 days from launch and reaching 20 million subscribers within 4 years of operations.

CEO of Etisalat UAE (2012 – 2016)
Al Abdooli was appointed as the Chief Executive Officer of Etisalat’s UAE operations in February 2012, replacing the operation's former CEO, Nasser Bin Obood.

Under Al Abdooli's leadership, the company has continued to invest in enhancing technological integration levels in the country. It has invested more than AED25 billion on mobile and fixed networks over the last 5 years.

CEO of Etisalat Group (2016 – 2020)
In March 2016, Al Abdooli announced as Etisalat's Group CEO.

In May 2020, Al Abdooli resigned from the Etisalat Group due to personal reasons.

References 

Living people
1964 births
Emirati chief executives
University of Colorado Boulder alumni